Mary Hoare (1744–1820) was an English painter. She was William Hoare's daughter and Prince Hoare's sister. The latter had a strong influence on her.

Life and career 
There is little known about Mary Hoare's life. In 1765 she married Henry Hoare (1744–1785). Between 1761 and 1764 she displayed works at the Society of Artists of Great Britain and at the Free Society of Artists.

Works by Hoare 
Most of her known works deal with scenes of Shakespearean plays and can be located at the Yale Center of British Art.

Further reading 
 Hammerschmidt-Hummel, Hildegard, ed. Die Shakespeare-Illustration (1594-2000): Bildkünstlerische Darstellungen zu den Dramen William Shakespeares: Katalog, Geschichte, Funktion und Deutung. Vol. 3, Katalog: Abbildungen 1494-3000, edited by Hildegard Hammerschmidt-Hummel. Wiesbaden: Harrassowitz Verlag, 2003.
 Kindler, Simone. Ophelia: Der Wandel von Frauenbild und Bildmotiv. Berlin: Reimer 2004.

External links 
 Mary Hoare's works at the Yale Center for British Art

References 

1753 births
1820 deaths
English dramatists and playwrights
18th-century English painters
19th-century English painters
English women painters
19th-century British women artists
19th-century English women
18th-century English women
18th-century English people